United Goans Democratic Party (UGDP) is one of two formerly dominant political parties in the Indian state of Goa. UGDP has its base amongst the Christian part of the population. It was founded in 1983 by Churchill Alemao.

In Goa, the UGDP is however not related to the old United Goans Party. The name United Goans Democratic Party is a mere spin-off of the name of the United Goans Party, and their election symbol of "two leaves" is a spin-off of the symbol of "two leaves" which was designated in the plebiscite to determine whether Goa should be independent, as against the rose symbol for voting Goa as a part of Maharashtra. The present United Goans Democratic Party had absolutely no role to play in the plebiscite to decide whether Goa should be a separate entity or not, but they continue to use the Two Leaves symbol and a name similar to that of the party which played a major role in ensuring that Goa remains distinct, the erstwhile United Goans Party. UDGP is much weaker than its claimed predecessor, the United Goans Party which was the main opposition party during the 1960s.

At the June 2007 state elections, the party took one out of 40 seats. It was allied with the Bharatiya Janata Party (BJP), while in opposition in Goa and in the national government.

In the Assembly elections of 2012, the United Goans Democratic Party could not win a single seat, while its lone MLA from the previous election, Mr. Mathany Saldanha, contested and won on a BJP ticket.

The United Goans Democratic Party and its founder Churchill Alemao (now in the NCP) along with his hand-picked three other family members were defeated in the hustings, causing the worst Congress defeat since the time when Congress first ruled Goa, almost thirty years ago. The present BJP government has rejected all attempts of the UGDP of showing that they are close to the present dispensation. The lone UGDP legislator from the last assembly Mr. Mathany Saldanha however, was rewarded for finally quitting the UGDP by having been allotted a prime ministry. After his untimely death, his widow is holding the responsibility.

The UGDP in the meanwhile, has lost its recognition as a party and has also lost its right to ownership of the "two leaves" symbol.

Its original leader though, went beyond using a name similar to the UGP (United Goans Party) and a symbol similar to Goa's Opinion Poll (plebiscite to determine whether Goa should be a separate identity). In the last elections he rode on the back of the Save Goa movement, a movement by various groups to save Goa from the badly prepared Regional Plan, and formed a party on ts own. His newly formed party won two seats, Navelim for himself and Curtorim for his protege Reginaldo Lourenco, under the name "SAVE GOA FRONT", a clear rip off of the Save Goa Movement which was ruling the press releases  at that time.

The UGDP is a party which takes up every issue that crops up before it. Its two supreme leaders Anacleto Viegas and Radharao Gracias always take up opposite stands, with one supporting the issue and the other opposing it.

Whichever side of the issue appears to be getting successful, gets the full UGDP backing, with the opposing leader relegating himself to a spectator.

The said two party supremos, Anacleto Viegas and Radharao Gracias are also senior advocates at Margao and South Goa. Both have been presidents of the Margao and South Goa Advocates Councils. Such appointments have led them to lead their own political campaigns under the banner of the Advocates' Union.

UDGP in Jharkhand
In Jharkhand the group of Joba Majhi is formally attached to the party, in order to be able to use the party election symbol 'two leaves'. In 2005 two seats in the Jharkhand assembly were won on the UGDP symbol.

See also
 Srirang Narvekar
 United Goans Party

References

 
Political parties in Jharkhand
Political parties in Goa
1983 establishments in Goa, Daman and Diu
Political parties established in 1983